Phyllostachys nuda (also known as nude sheath bamboo or snow bamboo) is a species of bamboo found in Anhui, Fujian, Hunan, Jiangsu, Jiangxi, Shaanxi, Zhejiang provinces of China and in Taiwan. It can survive temperatures down to -10 degrees Fahrenheit and requires full sun to thrive.

References

External links
 
 

nuda
Flora of China